The Fenholloway River is a small stream in Taylor County, Florida.

Georgia-Pacific purchased the Buckeye mill in 2013. The Foley Cellulose mill, now owned by Georgia-Pacific, invested over $300 million in mill improvements to complete the Fenholloway Water Quality Project in September 2020.

The river flow and pattern were restored to what it was prior to the start of Procter & Gamble pulp mill operations in 1954.  The Foley Cellulose Mill no longer discharges treated effluent directly into the Fenholloway River.

References

Rivers of Florida
Rivers of Taylor County, Florida